John Allan Swasey is an American voice actor, ADR Director, and script writer known for his work at Funimation, ADV Films and Sentai Filmworks.

He has provided voices for English-language versions of Japanese anime series and video games. His most notable roles include Gendo Ikari in the Rebuild of Evangelion films, Sir Crocodile in the Funimation dub of One Piece, Lord Death in Soul Eater, and Van Hohenheim in Fullmetal Alchemist: Brotherhood.

Outside of voice acting, Swasey is also the founder of Anime Dallas, an anime convention which debuted in 2018.

Filmography

Voice roles

Anime
1996
 Golden Boy – Director (Ep. 6, Debut Role)
1997
 Sol Bianca – Dr. Delapaz
1998
 Dirty Pair Flash – Andre (Ep. 3), Additional Voices
 New Cutey Honey – Dr. Kisaragi
1999
 Bubblegum Crisis: Tokyo 2040 – Dr. Stingray, Quincy Rosenkroitz
 Martian Successor Nadesico – Seiya Uribatake, Cowboy Johnny (Ep. 9), Einstein (Ep. 18), Gen. Masaka (Ep. 4), Emperor Hyperion (Ep. 14)
2000
 Dragon Half – Announcer, Narrator
 Gasaraki – Colonel Stilbanov, Kei Nishida, Ronald Feigan, Yoshitake Gowa
 Generator Gawl – Prof. Tekuma Nekasa, Additional Voices
2001
 A.D. Police – Hideaki Kurata, Kaibara
 Princess Nine – Principal Mita
 Sorcerous Stabber Orphen – Volkan
 Spriggan – Mr. Smith
2002
 Chance Pop Session – Yamanaka, Additional Voices
 Sorcerer on the Rocks – Count Cattlefish
 Steel Angel Kurumi – The General
2003
 Angelic Layer – Shouko's Dad, Kaede's Dad
 Aura Battler Dunbine – Bann Burning, Shunka Zama
 Crying Freeman – Tsunaike (ADV Dub)
 Dirty Pair: Project Eden – Prof. Wattsman
 Full Metal Panic! – Chairman Daicustra (Ep. 19), Shintaro Kazama (Ep. 14)
 Magical Shopping Arcade Abenobashi – Arata Imamiya
 Martian Successor Nadesico: The Motion Picture – Prince of Darkness – Seiya Uribatake
 Najica Blitz Tactics – Rasse Pewnt, Admiral
 Neo Ranga – Rano the Elder, Junichi Andou, Kento, Yamazaki 
 Noir – Dux (Ep. 3), Priest, Reimann (Ep. 12), Salvatore (Ep. 8)
 RahXephon – Shougo Rikudoh
 Saint Seiya – Phaeton, Hydra, Dios (ADV Dub)
 Saiyuki – Zenon, Fake Hakkai
 Super GALS! – Mr. Nakanishi, Detective Kudoh, Watari, Takashi Asai
2004
 All Purpose Cultural Cat Girl Nuku Nuku – Mr. Yamagata
 Aquarian Age: Sign for Evolution – Tachibana
 Azumanga Daioh – Principal, Dr. Ishihara
 Chrono Crusade – Edward "Elder" Hamilton, Carv
 Cyberteam in Akihabara – Hibari's Father
 D.N.Angel – Daiki Niwa
 Fullmetal Alchemist – Karl Haushofer
 Gravion – High Dignitary (Ep.8)
 Grrl Power – Hanazono
 Kaleido Star – Ken Robbins
 Megazone 23: Part 3  – Drakeman
 Mezzo DSA – Tanishi, Takizawa
 Neon Genesis Evangelion – Gendo Ikari (Director's Cut)
 Nurse Witch Komugi – Richard Vincent, Goto, Kaneda
 Peacemaker Kurogane – Isami Kondo
 Puni Puni Poemy – Narrator
 Sister Princess – Jeeves
2005
 Area 88 – Mickey Simon
 Burst Angel – Prof. Keiko Shiratoro
 Divergence Eve – Juhzou Kureha
 E's Otherwise – Kyou
 Elfen Lied – Professor Kakuzawa
 Full Metal Panic? Fumoffu – Teacher, Zenji Ohnuki (Ep. 5)
 Gantz – Muso Tokugawa, Naozumi Saito, Yoshioka, Iwaki
 Godannar – Tatsuya Aoi, Narrator
 Hakugei: Legend of the Moby Dick – Capt. Ahab
 Maburaho – Takashi Yamaguchi
 The Place Promised in Our Early Days – Okabe
 Tree of Palme – Gus, Zakuro
2006
 Diamond Daydreams – Akari's Father, Goto
 Fullmetal Alchemist the Movie: Conqueror of Shamballa – Karl Haushofer
 Guyver: The Bioboosted Armor – Fumio Fukamichi
 Jinki: Extend – Genta Ogawara
 Mythical Detective Loki Ragnarok – Fenrir
 Nanaka 6/17 – Taizo Kirisato
 Nerima Daikon Brothers – Police Chief (Ep. 4)
 Pani Poni Dash! – Michael, Professor (Ep. 9)
 Princess Tutu – Paulo, Montand, Armadylan
 Speed Grapher – Prime Minister Kamiya
 The Super Dimension Fortress Macross – Captain Bruno J. Global
 Tactics – Viscount Edogawa
 Trinity Blood – Archbishop Alphonso D'Este
2007
 009-1 – James (Ep. 13), Mylene's Father (Ep. 8)
 BECK: Mongolian Chop Squad – Kamejima
 Beet the Vandel Buster – Zenon
 Best Student Council – Ryuheita Iwazakura, Narrator, Yuichi Kimizuka (Ep. 9)
 Blade of the Phantom Master – Fuan-bo
 Case Closed: The Fourteenth Target – Peter Ford
 Coyote Ragtime Show – Mister
 Shin-Chan (Funimation dub) – Yoshiji Koyama
 Full Metal Panic! The Second Raid – Gates
 Glass Fleet – Conrad, Nicholas
 Hell Girl – Ryousuke Sekine (Ep. 21)
 Innocent Venus – Maximas Drake
 Jing: King of Bandits – Seventh Heaven – McQuade, Medaldo
 Kurau: Phantom Memory – Ichise, Makurazaki
 Le Chevalier D'Eon – Teillagory
 Mushishi – Saishu (Ep. 9)
 One Piece (Funimation dub) – Sir Crocodile
 Red Garden – Claude
 School Rumble – Genkai Goto (2nd season)
 Shigurui: Death Frenzy – Kengyou Shizuhata
 Tokyo Majin – Koni Fernandez, Mikuriya, Togo Narutaki
 Tsubasa: Reservoir Chronicle – Mr. Glosum
 Venus Versus Virus – Soichiro Nahashi
 Utawarerumono – Sasante
 Welcome to the NHK – Go Minegishi, Sukekiyo Sagawa
 Xenosaga: The Animation – Andrew Cherenkov
2008
 Aquarion – Lopez (Ep. 15)
 Claymore – Isley
 Darker than Black – Huang, Naoyasu Kirihara
 Devil May Cry: The Animated Series – Fredi
 Kanon – Mr. Ishibashi (Ep. 2), Sayuri's Father (Ep. 14)
 Moonlight Mile – Robert
 One Piece Movie: The Desert Princess and the Pirates: Adventures in Alabasta – Sir Crocodile
 Ouran High School Host Club – Chairman Yuzuru Suou
 Project Blue Earth SOS – Secretary General Freeman
2009
 Baccano! – Van Dyke (Ep. 14)
 Big Windup! – Tosei Coach
 Blassreiter – Shido Kasugi
 El Cazador de la Bruja – Enrique (Ep. 8)
 Gunslinger Girl – Il Teatrino – Christiano Savonarola
 Kaze no Stigma – Bernhardt Rhodes
 Kenichi: The Mightiest Disciple – Mototsugu Shirahama
 Murder Princess – King Forland (Ep. 1)
 Rebuild of Evangelion – Gendo Ikari
 Sgt. Frog – Kogoro
2010
 Birdy the Mighty: Decode – Geega
 Blue Drop – Headmaster Fukamachi
 Canaan – Toyama
 Case Closed: The Phantom of Baker Street – Booker Kudo
 Dragon Ball: Curse of the Blood Rubies – Narrator
 Dragon Ball Z Kai – Dodoria, ZTV Announcer, Farmer (Ep. 1)
 Dragonaut: The Resonance – Eiji Kamishina (Jin's Father Ep. 1)
 Fullmetal Alchemist: Brotherhood – Van Hohenheim
 Ghost Hound – Mayor Motoi Yazaki
 Halo Legends – Sergeant Hauser (Homecoming), Captain (Odd One Out)
 Initial D: Fourth Stage – Kozo Hoshino
 Legends of the Dark King – Ryuga, Jirai
 Linebarrels of Iron – Dr. Amagatsu Kizaki
 One Piece (Funimation dub) – Gan Fall
 Rin ~Daughters of Mnemosyne – Tajimamori
 Soul Eater – Lord Death
 Tears to Tiara – Drwc, Tempesta, Ogam
2011
 Black Butler series – Undertaker, Mr. Damiano (Season 1, Ep.1), Laurence Anderson (The Story of Will the Reaper)
 Casshern Sins – Gido (Ep. 11)
 Chaos;Head – Yasuji Ban
 Fairy Tail – Hades/Precht
 The Guin Saga – Casslon, Count Rickard
 My Bride Is a Mermaid – Gozaburo Seto
 Night Raid 1931 – 1st Lt. Mursawa (Ep. 14), Horst Stein (Ep. 5), Jiro Minami (Ep. 7), Miki (Ep. 6), Morito Morishima (Ep. 7)
 Sengoku Basara: Samurai Kings – Oda Nobunaga
 Summer Wars – Mansuke Jinnouchi
 Trigun: Badlands Rumble – Gasback
2012
 The Book of Bantorra – Governor of Paradise
 Dragon Age: Dawn of the Seeker – Byron
 Gintama: The Movie – Tetsuya Murata, Additional Voices
 Intrigue in the Bakumatsu – Irohanihoheto – Jube Nakaiya
 King of Thorn – Ivan Coral Vega
 Majikoi! – Oh! Samurai Girls – Tesshin Kawakami
 Panty & Stocking with Garterbelt – Judgement Day Host (Ep. 8B)
2013
 Aquarion Evol – Commander
 Campione! – Sasha Dejanstahl Voban
 Eureka Seven: AO – Ivica Tanovic
 Guilty Crown – Makoto Waltz Segai
 La storia della Arcana Famiglia – Fukurota
 Little Busters! – Koujiro Kamikita
 Log Horizon – Malves Garitier
 Momo: The Girl God of Death – Kotaro Ichihara (Ep. 3)
 Nakaimo – My Sister is Among Them! – Kumagorou Mikadono
 Phi Brain: Puzzle of God – Genius Okudera
 Rurouni Kenshin – New Kyoto Arc – Hajime Saitō
 Sengoku Basara: The Last Party – Oda Nobunaga
 Tenchi Muyo! War on Geminar – Gaia, King Shurifon
 Toriko – Alfaro
2014
 Attack on Titan – Dhalis Zachary
 Devil Survivor 2: The Animation – Tico (Male), Bifrons, Ceberus 
 Ghost in the Shell: Arise – Aramaki
 Jormungand – Leon Rivière 
 Majestic Prince – Dai Komine, Diego, Noritada, Poco
 Mardock Scramble: The Third Exhaust – Cleanwill John October
 Psycho-Pass – Jyunmai Itoh (Ep. 14)
 Short Peace – Merle (A Farewell to Weapons), Oni (Gambo)
 Sunday Without God – Yuuto (Ep. 1)
 Tamako Market – Gohei Oji
 Diabolik Lovers – Karlheinz 
2015
 Akame ga Kill! – Bols, Nobunaga (Ep. 9, uncredited), Spy (Ep. 4)
 Beyond the Boundary – Grandfather Nase
 Death Parade – Spinner
 Dog & Scissors – Genji, Fumio Honda
 Freezing Vibration – Howard el Bridget (Ep. 7)
 Gangsta. – Chad Adkins
 No Game, No Life – Ino Hatsuse
 The Rolling Girls – Mamoru Uotora
 Vampire Hunter D – Dr. Ferrino (Sentai dub)
2016
 The Boy and the Beast – Kumatetsu
 Dennō Coil – Ichiro Okonogi
 Lord Marksman and Vanadis –  Mashas Rodant
 My Hero Academia –  All For One
2017
 Alice and Zoroku – Zoroku Kashimura
 Amagi Brilliant Park –  Ironbeard, King Crimson (Ep. 14)
 Flying Witch –  Keiji Kuramoto
 Food Wars!: Shokugeki no Soma –  Senzaemon Nakiri
 GATE –  Kato El Alestan
 Haikyu!! –  Yasufumi Nekomata (Eps. 12-13)
 Is It Wrong to Try to Pick Up Girls in a Dungeon? –  Ganesha
 My Hero Academia Season 2 – All For One
 Knight's & Magic –  Lauri Echevarria
 Restaurant to Another World –  Tatsugoro
 Ushio & Tora –  Hakumen no Mono, Shigure Aotsuki

2018
 Made in Abyss –  Habolg
 Nomad of Nowhere –  El Rey
 My Hero Academia Season 3 – All For One
 Attack On Titan Season 3 – Dhalis Zachary
 UQ Holder! - Jack Rakan, Shaba Gyurei (Ep. 8)

2019
 My Youth Romantic Comedy Is Wrong, As I Expected – Kamakura
 Date A Live III - Elliot Baldwin Woodman (Ep. 3)
 My Hero Academia Season 4 – All For One

2020
 To Love Ru – Principal / Ghi Blee
 Peter Grill and the Philosopher's Time – Guildmaster

2021
 Vinland Saga – Leif
 My Hero Academia Season 5 – All For One

2022
 Date A Live IV – Elliot Baldwin Woodman
 Reincarnated as a Sword – Garrus
 My Hero Academia Season 6 – All For One
 RWBY: Ice Queendom - Nicholas Schnee (ep11)

2023
 Vinland Saga Season 2 – Leif
 Urusei Yatsura – Cherry

Video games
 Borderlands 2 – Salvador, Flanksteak
 Dragon Ball series – Dodoria, Farmer, ZTV Announcer (2010–present)
 Monark – Yugo Jingu
 My Hero One's Justice 2 – All For One
 One Piece: Unlimited Adventure – Sir Crocodile

Live action
 Chase – Carl Spackler
 Dazed and Confused – Beer Delivery Guy
 Friday Night Lights – Coach Granger 
 Paradise, Texas – Buckeye
 Ray – Customs Agent #1
 Walker, Texas Ranger – Derrick, Kyle Wheeler, Steve Darby
 Where the Heart Is – Jerry
 Barney's Night Before Christmas — Dad

Production staff

Voice director
 Air Gear
 After the Rain
 BanG Dream! (Season 2)
 E's Otherwise
 Innocent Venus
Iroduku: The World in Colors
 Jinki: Extend
 La storia della Arcana Famiglia
 Majikoi! - Oh! Samurai Girls
 Medaka Box Abnormal
 Nakaimo - My Sister is Among Them!
 Phi Brain: Puzzle of God (Season 2)
 Saint Seiya
 Shadow Skill - Eigi
 Squid Girl (Season 2 & OVAs)
 Ushio & Tora
 Vinland Saga
 Wandaba Style
 Welcome to the N.H.K.

Script adaptation
 Innocent Venus
 Jinki: Extend
 La storia della Arcana Famiglia
 Nakaimo - My Sister is Among Them!

References

External links
 
 
 

Living people
American male voice actors
Male actors from Houston
American voice directors
Year of birth missing (living people)